The Cathedral of San Juan de Albacete is a Roman Catholic church located in Albacete, Spain. It was declared Bien de Interés Cultural in 1982.

History
The church of San Juan was constructed in 1515 in place of a Mudéjar edifice. At this time, Albacete belonged to the Diocese of Cartagena. In the 16th century the previous Gothic vaults were demolished and replaced with the current Baroque ones. In 1936, during the Spanish Civil War its bells were melted down only to be replaced in 1947 by its current bells. It was also during this post war period, in 1949 when the principal facade was finished and the Diocese of Albacete was formed, elevating the church to cathedral status. In 1960 the lateral facade was finished in a Romanesque Revival style.

References

External links
Cathedral of Albacete in jdiezarnal
Cathedral of Albacete in Arteguias
Bells of the Cathedral of Albacete

San Juan de Albacete
Churches in Castilla–La Mancha
Buildings and structures in Albacete
Bien de Interés Cultural landmarks in the Province of Albacete